Ian Bartholomew (born 1954) is an English actor.

Ian Bartholomew may also refer to:
John (Ian) Bartholomew (1890–1962), Scottish cartographer
Ian Bartholomew (cricketer) (born 1983), English cricketer and flood insurer